Marjan Minnesma (born 1966) is a Dutch activist.

Biography
Marjan Minnesma was born and raised in Amsterdam. She holds a degree in international law on climate change.

In 2022, she received Goldman Environmental Prize for suing the Dutch government over its carbon emissions plans. She won this lawsuit, becoming first woman to successfully sue a government over carbon emissions.

Minnesma is the founder of Urgenda Foundation, which aims to help enforce national, European and international environment treaties.

Recognition
 2022: Goldman Environmental Prize

References

Living people
Dutch activists
1966 births
Dutch women activists